was a town located in Nishiuwa District, Ehime Prefecture, Japan.

As of 2003, the town had an estimated population of 10,686 and a density of 288.73 persons per km2. The total area was 37.01 km2.

On March 28, 2005, Honai was merged into the expanded city of Yawatahama.

External links
Yawatahama official website in Japanese

Dissolved municipalities of Ehime Prefecture
Yawatahama, Ehime